Buritis Park (Portuguese: Parque dos Buritis) is an urban park in Lucas do Rio Verde, Brazil. 
The Buritis Park is the most visited attraction in the city and the only park of open city stop the public.

References

Geography of Mato Grosso
Parks in Brazil
Lucas do Rio Verde